A command sergeant major (CSM) is a non-commissioned rank and position of office in the United States Army. The holder of this rank and position is the most senior enlisted member of a color-bearing Army unit (battalion or higher). The CSM is appointed to serve as a spokesman to address the issues of all soldiers, from enlisted to officers, from warrant officers and lieutenants to the Army's highest positions. As such, they are the senior enlisted advisor to the commander. The exact duties vary depending on the unit commander, including observing training and talking with soldiers and their families.

History
The command sergeant major, as the most senior sergeant of a color-bearing unit, began in July 1967, with a final definition of duties in December 1975. In contrast, the duties of a sergeant major have been defined in the U.S. Army since the days of von Steuben (1779). The need for a senior enlisted advisor to a commander was recognized in the Vietnam War era (December 1966).

CSMs are selected for assignment only after training as top enlisted leaders.

Insignia

See also

Sergeant Major of the Army

References

Military ranks of the United States Army
United States military enlisted ranks
Senior Enlisted Advisor